MadCap Software is an American computer software firm headquartered in San Diego, California that creates help authoring tools and solutions for technical writers and documentations teams.  Several principal managers, software engineers, and support personnel were recruited from rival firms, such as Adobe Systems and Macromedia, to found MadCap Software.  MadCap's authoring tools are all based on xHTML.

Origins
Some of MadCap Software's founders were associated with eHelp and its core product, RoboHelp, a help authoring tool. After it was bought by Macromedia in 2003, the eHelp developers were laid off. MadCap co-founder Bjorn Backlund had headed the RoboHelp development team. He saw an opportunity to compete with RoboHelp by rewriting the program using XML and expanding the software. MadCap's founding CEO, Anthony Olivier, had been eHelp's CEO.

Products
MadCap Flare, a content authoring tool that generates output in various formats, including HTML5, Eclipse Help, Microsoft Compiled HTML Help, Microsoft Word, PDF, EPUB, and WebHelp
MadCap Central, a cloud-based solution for hosting, project management, build automation, and task management
 MadCap Doc-To-Help, an authoring and publishing tool for users who want to create and manage content in a familiar Microsoft® Word environment
MadCap Capture, a screen capture tool
MadCap Contributor, content review for subject matter experts, managers
MadCap Lingo, a CAT tool used with Flare, Word, PowerPoint
MadCap Mimic, a tool for recording tutorials and software simulations
MadCap Pulse, analytic and social collaboration tool

MadCap Flare 
The key concept behind MadCap Flare is single-source publishing. This is a method of content management which allows content to be used more than once across different media. Flare supports topic-based authoring and content management. Topic-based authoring means content is written in modular topics that can stand alone and be mixed or reused as needed.

Content creators can produce online help systems, eLearning modules, knowledge bases, document portals, and various guides and manuals, for use online or in print. Flare has streamlined content production.

There are many ways in Flare to reuse content, which saves time maintaining or updating topics.

Create content from scratch or import existing legacy documentation from a variety of sources. Add or edit content in the XML Editor, or edit the source code manually in the Text Editor. Share projects for team collaboration and feedback. Author content in other languages and perform translations with ease. Publish content to one of several different output types. Use built-in analytics to monitor user interaction and improve overall user satisfaction.

MadCap Flare Plugins
 The Kaizen Plugin is a free productivity plugin for MadCap Flare, developed by Sander Improvement Software AB, based in Sweden.
 The Mad Quality plugin is a quality assurance plugin for MadCap Flare, developed by Sander Improvement Software AB.
 The Markdown plugin is a Markdown conversion plugin for MadCap Flare, developed by Sander Improvement Software AB.
 The Automator plugin is a plugin for MadCap Flare that lets you integrate 3rd party apps with Flare, developed by Sander Improvement Software AB.
The MadCap Connect for Salesforce® plugin for MadCap Flare, developed by MadCap Software.
The MadCap Connect for Zendesk plugin for MadCap Flare, developed by MadCap Software.
The Author-it® Converter for MadCap Flare, developed by MadCap Software.

See also
 Office Open XML software
 Help authoring tool

References

External links

The Official MadCap Software Forum
MadCap Flare Review at PCWorld
WhatsApp Plus
WA Plus
The Kaizen Plugin for Flare
Sander Improvement Software AB

Software companies based in California
Companies based in San Diego
Technical communication tools
Privately held companies based in California
Software companies of the United States